Anania amphinephela is a moth in the family Crambidae. It was described by Edward Meyrick in 1933. It is found in the Democratic Republic of the Congo and Kenya.

References

Moths described in 1933
Pyraustinae
Moths of Africa